Hege Anett Pettersson (née Hege Anett Johansen; born 30 June 1973) is a Norwegian handball player who played for the club Tertnes HE. She played eight matches for the national handball team in 2000, including participation at the 2000 European Women's Handball Championship.

References

External links
 

1973 births
Living people
Norwegian female handball players
21st-century Norwegian women